The Yes Men Fix the World is a 2009 English language documentary film about the culture jamming exploits of The Yes Men. The film premiered in New York City and Los Angeles on October 23, 2009 and in other U.S. cities beginning on October 30. Due to the movie being sued by United States Chamber of Commerce, a special edition of the movie is distributed through bittorrent through VODO and other prominent torrent sites like The Pirate Bay and EZTV.

The film documents the following projects:
 Dow Chemical and Bhopal
 ExxonMobil Vivoleum
 Halliburton Survivaball
 HUD and post-Katrina public housing
 The New York Times hopeful future edition

References

External links
 The Yes Men Fix the World - Peer to Peer Edition Free video download at Internet Archive
 
 The Yes Men Fix the World: In New Film — video report by Democracy Now!

2009 comedy films
Documentary films about business
The Yes Men
Anti-modernist films
American business films
French documentary films
British documentary films
2009 films
Films about activists
2000s business films
2000s English-language films
American documentary films
2000s American films
2000s British films
2000s French films